Conscription in South Korea has existed since 1957 and requires male citizens between the ages of 18 and 35 to perform compulsory military service. Women are not required to perform military service, but they may voluntarily join the military.

Establishment 
The basis for military conscription in South Korea is the Constitution of the Republic of Korea, which was promulgated on 17 July 1948. The constitution states in Article 39, "All citizens shall have the duty of national defense under the conditions as prescribed by Act."

In addition, the conscription is defined and acted by the "Military Service Act" (병역법). According to the "Military Service Act" Article 3, "Every male the Republic of Korea shall faithfully perform mandatory military service, as prescribed by the Constitution of the Republic of Korea and this Act. A female may perform only active service or reserve service through volunteering" and "Except as provided in this Act, no special case concerning mandatory military service shall be prescribed". Only males being drafted was confirmed by the Constitutional Court of Korea, which declared in 2006 that it is the right of government to decide whoever is subject of the conscription, and hence there is no constitutional error of government decisions. Conscription is managed by the Military Manpower Administration, which was created in 1948.

Enlistment and impairment-disability evaluation 
By law, when a South Korean man turns 18 years old, he is enlisted for "first citizen service," meaning he is liable for military duty, but is not yet required to serve. When he turns 19 years old (or, in some instances, 20 years old), he is required to undergo an Impairment & Disability evaluation to determine whether he is suitable for military service. The table below shows the evaluation's possible grades and their outcomes, according to the Military Service Act. Men must enlist by the time they turn 28.

Term of South Korea military service

Certificate Of Military Registration

Military service age 
The age standard is from January 1 to December 31 of the year of age.

 ■: Age group of Mandatory Military service 
 ■: Age group of Mandatory Military service in Wartime

History of military service age

1971 to 1984

1984 to 1993

1994 to 2010

Determination criteria of physical grades 
There are seven physical grades. Grade name is I, II, III, IV, V, VI and VII. Before 1984 grades name is A, B (respectively B-I, B-II, B-III), C, D and E

I, II, III and IV is Accepted, and grades V, VI and VII is Rejected.

The criteria for determining the physical grade shall be in accordance with Attached form 2 and 3 of the "Rules for examination of Conscription Physical Examination, etc.(:ko:병역판정 신체검사 등 검사규칙)"
Attached form 2 sets the criteria for determining height and weight. Attached form 3 is the evaluation criteria for diseases and mental and physical disabilities, which vary from year to year.

In the following criteria, diseases and mental and physical disabilities are described mainly as representative or known.

Disposition for military service by educational background and physical grade 
According to Article 14 of the Military Service Act, grades I to IV are based on qualifications (education, age, etc.) and are subject to active service, supplementary, wartime workers, Grade V exemptions, Grade VI exemptions, and Grade VII medical examinations. The criteria for disposing of active duty or supplementary officers in grades I to IV are determined by the Military Manpower Administration's announcement (annual announcement of conscription inspection). According to the announcement, the criteria for military service are as follows.

 ■: Active duty (현역, Subject to Enlist for Active duty. Subject to Draft)
 ■: Supplementary service (보충역)
 ■：Wartime labor service (전시근로역)
 ■: Exempted from Military service (병역면제)
 ■: Subject to Physical Reexamination (재검사대상)

History of disposition for military service

1950s to 1969 
Before the 1970s, the criteria for disposition of active duty and supplementary military service cannot be confirmed due to lack of data at the time.

in 1950 to 1955 
 1950: It was the first year in the Republic of Korea that the Conscription was implemented. At that year, due to the limitation of 100,000 troops by the Korean military, the conscription system and Conscription Examination were suspended. However, in June of the same year, when the Korean War broke out, there was an unofficial conscription.
 1952: As the Conscription system was Implemented again, Conscription Examination began again.

1956

1957 
 The supplementary military service was abolished by the enforcement of the revised Military Service Act from August 1957.

1958 to 1960 
 On February 24, 1958, there were Re-examination measures after canceling the judgment on 45,000 Grade C judges in the 1950 to 1957 Conscription examination.

1961 
 There was a physical examination of public officials who were judged to be Grade C.
 In 1961, there was a physical examination of 128,422 embroidered persons who reported between June 21 and June 30, which was set as the period for reporting embroidery of those who failed to serve in the military.

1962 
 Those born on or after January 1, 1930 who have been punished for active service under the Military Service Act enacted before October 1, 1962 and who have not joined the army, will be transferred to the 1st supplementary role and will be supplemented. (Except for those who joined the National Land Construction Team(:ko:국토건설단) in 1961.)

1963 to 1969 
 Among those who were examined for conscription in 1962, those who were judged to be Grade B4 and B5 were transferred to Grade C and converted to 2nd Citizen service.

After 1970s

1970

1971

1972

1973 
 Middle school Graduated or more
 Grade A, B-I, B-II: Active duty
 Grade B-III: Supplementary service
 Elementary school Graduated or more, Middle school Dropout or less
 Grade A: Active duty
 Grade B-I, B-II, B-III: Supplementary service
 Elementary school Dropout or less: 2nd Citizen service

1974 to 1976 
 College attending or more
 Grade A, B-I, B-II: Active duty
 Grade B-III: Supplementary service
 Middle school Graduated or more, High school Dropout or less
 Grade A, B-I: Active duty
 Grade B-II, B-III: Supplementary service
 Elementary school Graduated or more, Middle school Dropout or less
 Grade A: Active duty
 Grade B-I, B-II, B-III: Supplementary service

1977 to 1979 
 College attending or more
 Grade A, B-I, B-II, B-III: Active duty
 High school Graduated or less
 Grade A, B-I: Active duty
 Grade B-II, B-III: Supplementary service
 Middle school Dropout or less: 2nd Citizen service

1980 to 1983 
 College attending or more
　Grade A, B-I, B-II: Active duty
　Grade B-III: Supplementary service
 High school Graduated or less
　Grade A: Active duty
　Grade B-I, II, III: Supplementary service

1984 
In 1984, Change of Physical Grade Name.

 College attending or more
　Grade I, II, III: Active duty
　Grade IV: Supplementary service
 High school Graduated
　Grade I, II: Active duty
　Grade III, IV: Supplementary service
 High school Dropout or less
　Grade I: Active duty
　Grade II, III, IV: Supplementary service

1985

1986

1987 
 High school Graduated or more
　Grade I, II: Active duty
　Grade III, IV: Supplementary service
 High school Dropout or less
　Grade I: Active duty
　Grade II, III, IV: Supplementary service

1988 to 1991 
 1988: Skipped Conscription Examination of Elementary school Graduated or less
 1989: Those aged 25 or older among those graduating from High school will be converted to Supplementary service.
 June 1, 1991: High school graduates who are 162 centimeters or less, high school graduates and those who are above university students, and who are Grade II (and III, IV) due to myopia of ophthalmology, will be converted to Supplementary service. (A person who was Conscription examined from 1990)
 November 15, 1991: Those who graduated from high school and a Physical grade II will be converted to Supplementary service. (A person who was Conscription examined from 1991)
 January 1, 1992: Middle school Dropout or less is Supplementary service. (Exemption from Call of Bangwi)

1992 
 Middle school Graduated or more, Physical grade I, II, III, IV: Active duty. But, on October 30 of the same year, it was changed as follows:
 High school Graduated or more, Physical grade III, IV: converted to Supplementary service
 High school Dropout or less, Physical grade I, II, III, IV: converted to Supplementary service

1993 
 High school Graduated or more
 Grade I, II, III: Active duty
 Grade IV: Supplementary service
 High school Dropout and Middle school Graduated with Grade I, II, III, IV: Supplementary service

1994 
 High school Graduated or more with Grade I, II, III, IV: Active duty
 High school Dropout
 Grade I: Active duty
 Grade II, III, IV: Supplementary service
 Middle school Graduated with Grade I, II, III, IV: Supplementary service

1995 to 1996 
 High school Graduated or more
 Grade I, II, III: Active duty
 Grade IV: Supplementary service
 Those who graduated from middle school and a Physical grade I, II, III, IV will be converted to Supplementary service from 1996

1997 
 High school Dropout or more
 Grade I, II, III: Active duty
 Grade IV: Supplementary service
 Middle school Graduated
 Grade I, II, III, IV: Supplementary service
 High school Dropout with Physical grade III: converted to Supplementary service from June 2, 1997
 High school Dropout with Physical grade II: converted to Supplementary service from January 1, 1998

1998 to 2003 
 High school Graduated or more
 Grade I, II, III: Active duty
 Grade IV: Supplementary service
 Middle school Graduated, High school Dropout
 Grade I, II, III, IV: Supplementary service
 1999 to 2011
 Skipped Conscription Examination with Transferred the 2nd Citizen service of Middle school Dropout or less in 1999 to 2011

2004 
 Middle school Graduated or more
 Grade I, II, III: Active duty
 Grade IV: Supplementary service

2005 
 College attending or more with Grade I, II, III, IV: Active duty
 Middle school Graduated and High school Dropout
 Grade I, II, III: Active duty
 Grade IV: Supplementary service

2006 to 2011 
 Middle school Graduated or more
 Grade I, II, III: Active duty
 Grade IV: Supplementary service

2012 to 1st half of 2015 
 Middle school Graduated or more
 Grade I, II, III: Active duty
 Grade IV: Supplementary service
 Middle school Dropout or less with Physical Grade I, II, III, IV: Supplementary service

External links
 Public Notice of Draft examination in 2014(Military Manpower Administration Public Notice No. 2014-2)

2nd half of 2015 to 2020 
 High school Graduated or more
 Grade I, II and III: Active duty
 Grade IV: Supplementary service
 High school Dropout of less with Physical grade I, II, III, IV: Supplementary service

External links
 (Korean) Public Notice of Draft examination in 2016(Military Manpower Administration Public Notice No. 2016-3)
 (Korean) Public Notice of Draft examination in 2017(Military Manpower Administration Public Notice No. 2017-1)
 (Korean) Public Notice of Draft examination in 2018(Military Manpower Administration Public Notice No. 2018-1)
 (Korean) Public Notice of Draft examination in 2019(Military Manpower Administration Public Notice No. 2019-1)
 (Korean) Public Notice of Draft examination in 2020(Military Manpower Administration Public Notice No. 2020-1)

Service types and length

Grade 1, 2, 3 and 4: those are suitable for military service (현역) 
The length of compulsory military service in South Korea varies based on military branch. Active duty soldiers serve 1 year 6 months in the Army or Marine Corps, 1 year 8 months in the Navy, or 1 year 9 months in the Air Force. After conscripts finish their military service, they are automatically placed on the reserve roster and are obligated to attend 3 days of annual military training for 6 years (5 years from 2021).

Non-active duty personnel, or "supplemental service" personnel serve for various lengths: 1 year 9 months for social work personnel (better known as public service workers - personnel ordered to do public service work at places that require auxiliary workers such as local community centers like city halls, government agencies, and public facilities like subway stations); 2 years 10 months for arts and sports personnel or industrial technical personnel; and 3 years for public health doctors, lawyers, veterinarians, or expert researchers.

In 2010, there was growing public pressure to either shorten the length of conscription or to switch to voluntary military service, and calls from experts for a gradual phasing out of conscription rather than complete abolition. However, in December 2010, after taking into consideration of the 2010 ROKS Cheonan sinking and Bombardment of Yeonpyeong incidents, the South Korean government said it would not reduce service periods.

Grade 4: those are unsuitable for the military service (보충역)

Art-sports personnel (예술체육요원)
Artists and players who have won government accredited competitions are allowed to work as 'Art-Sports personnel (예술체육요원)'. After a month of military training, Art-Sports service agents work through their specialties to finish their military services; e.g. in professional sports teams, art galleries, museums or orchestra bands. Unlike other service agents who are working at factories, farms, universities, institutes or nursing homes, Art-Sports service agents are allowed to work abroad.

Former president Park Chung-hee introduced exemptions for athletes in 1973 in an effort to win more medals for the country; some historians believe the athletics also served as a distraction against the government's unpopularity. After winning a gold medal at the 1976 Summer Olympics, wrestler Yang Jung-mo was granted the first exemption. In the 1980s, president Chun Doo-hwan promised exemptions to any athlete who won a medal in either the 1986 Asian Games or the 1988 Summer Olympics.

When South Korea co-hosted the FIFA World Cup in 2002, their national team was guaranteed an exemption if they reached the round of 16; the same promise was made to the national baseball team in 2006 if the team reached semifinals in the World Baseball Classic. Public outrage ensued, and similar exemptions have been rarely granted since.

Current conscription regulations stipulate that athletes who win medals in the Olympic Games or gold medals in the Asian Games are granted exemptions from military service and are placed in Grade 4. They are required to do four weeks of basic military training and engage in sports field for 42 months. After that, they are automatically placed on the reserve roster, and are obligated to attend a few days of annual military training for six years. In practice, after athletes finish their four weeks of basic military training, they are able to continue their own sports career during the 34 months of duty.

The policy has resulted in coaches being accused of selecting players desperate to avoid military service instead of choosing the best athletes. Parents encourage their children to pursue sports in hopes of them receiving an exemption.

Notable athletes who have been granted exemptions from military service are the bronze medal-winning football team at the 2012 Summer Olympics, 2008 Olympic gold medalist badminton player Lee Yong-dae, swimmer Park Tae-hwan, 2014 Asian Games gold medalist tennis player Chung Hyeon, 2018 Asian Games gold medalist footballer Son Heung-min, and 2018 Asian Games gold medalist baseball player Lee Jung-hoo.

Esport competitors are not exempt from conscription.

A total of 220 exemptions were granted from 2008 to 2018.

Exemptions are also granted to classical musicians and ballet performers who win first place in stipulated international-level competitions. A two year extension for notable K-pop artists (from a law that was passed in December 2020) could also be given by government for their career, the age for joining military is 30 (which previously was 28). Some resources and media outlets claim that the primary reason for this amendment was singer-songwriter Kim Seok-jin, who, at the time, was about to turn 28. As his group BTS has had a huge impact (especially in the music industry) worldwide and contributed greatly to the spread of the Korean culture and Hallyu Wave, exemptions for them were in talks for a few years. Despite this, BTS's record label, Big Hit, announced on October 17, 2022 that Kim Seok-jin withdrew his enlistment deferral request and will be the first in the group to enter into mandatory military service, with other members of BTS to be enlisted on a later date.

Conscientious objection
The right to conscientious objection was not recognized in South Korea until recently. Over 400 men were typically imprisoned at any given time for refusing military service for political or religious reasons in the years before right to conscientious objection was established.

On 28 June 2018, the South Korean Constitutional Court ruled the Military Service Act unconstitutional and ordered the government to accommodate civilian forms of military service for conscientious objectors. Later that year on 1 November 2018, the South Korean Supreme Court legalized conscientious objection as a basis for rejecting compulsory military service.

Salary and benefits
Salary per month in 2017

Salary per month in 2018

Salary per month in 2019

Salary per month in 2020

Salary per month in 2021

Salary per month in 2022

Salary per month in 2023

Equipment
The Ministry of National Defense has revealed that it failed to provide sneakers to 7,411 recruits who joined the military from 22 May to 4 June 2012, after the budget was insufficient for need. The Defense ministry originally projected the cost of each pair of sneakers to be 11,000 KRW. However, the actual cost turned out to be 15,000 KRW.

The office of National Assembly member Kim Kwang-jin of Democratic United Party revealed that cadets in Korea Military Academy were provided with sneakers worth 60,000 KRW and tennis shoes. Cadets in Korea Army Academy at Yeongcheon were provided with sneakers worth 64,250 KRW, in addition to running shoes and soccer shoes.

Dual citizens
For dual citizens, or those with multiple citizenships, male South Koreans must choose their citizenship by the time they turn 18, before 31 March of that year. If these males choose to revoke their South Korean citizenship, they will not be required to complete their mandatory military service. However, if they fail to choose their citizenship by their 18th year, they will be subjected to fulfill their mandatory military service and, for those who wish to maintain their multiple citizenships, an oath not to exert foreign nationality within two years since finishing their military service. If males choose to renounce their citizenship by their 18th year, they are ineligible to gain a South Korean work visa (F series) until after they turn 40 years of age. It may still be possible to gain an E series visa.

There have been cases of Koreans abroad (e.g. Korean Americans) being forced to serve in the military, as they were unaware they were actually citizens of South Korea. This happens when these people visit South Korea. One cause of this is the inadvertent inclusion on the family register.

Controversies

Violation of Forced Labour Convention 
The Forced Labour Convention explicitly excludes "any work or service exacted in virtue of compulsory military service laws for work of a purely military character" from its scope. However, ILO defines conscription of non-military purpose as forced labour.

According to ILO, South Korean conscription violates the forced labour convention, because South Korea enrolls men with disabilities for non-military purposes. Majority (+90%) of the "Reserve - class 4 -" works as "social service agent (사회복무요원)", and work with wages far less than the minimum legal wage at various fields including government offices, subway stations, tax offices, post offices and sanitarium.

In April 2021, South Korea ratified the Forced Labour Convention. But the conscription of South Korea did not change. South Korea changed its conscription law by providing "right to decide to be enrolled" to "reserve - class 4 -. those with minor disabilities". South Korea claims that this change makes the conscription legitimate because "reserve - class 4-" now have right to decide their methods of conscription between soldiers with active duty and "social service agents".

However, ILO informed that enforcing "reserve - class 4-" to work as "social service agent" is a violation of the Forced Labour Convention in a number of their annual reports.

Hazing

Lowering standards of acceptance
In recent years, the South Korean government is preparing a policy to lower conscription standards for mental and physical conditions that would previously be considered exempt, as it fears that the nation's low birthrate will lead to fewer conscripts. In 2021, South Korea had the lowest fertility rate in the world, a title also bestowed on the country the previous year. However, experts warn that such actions will lead to wider problems already present in the military, by recruiting personnel who would not be able to adapt to the closed military.

Draft evasion
In general, the South Korean public tends to be intolerant towards men who attempt to evade mandatory military service or receive special treatment, especially if they are exploiting family wealth or political connections. Draft evasion is a punishable crime, but many entertainers, athletes, politicians and their children are known to have fabricated medical or other reasons to seek exemption from military service. According to a 2017 report by the Military Manpower Administration, the most common evasion tactic was extreme weight loss or gain (37%), followed by fabrication of mental illness (23.7%), and deliberate full-body tattoos (20.3%). Studying abroad or migrating overseas to obtain foreign citizenship are considered the preferred option for sons in wealthy families, while nearly a hundred high-ranking politicians including sitting members of the National Assembly have managed to arrange unexplained exemptions for their sons. These cases of draft evasion are to be distinguished from conscientious objection on political or religious grounds.

Yoo Seung-jun (Steve Yoo) 
In 2002, just before South Korean pop singer Yoo Seung-jun was due to be drafted for his military service, he became a naturalized U.S. citizen. He was born in Seoul and migrated to the United States at the age of 13. The South Korean government considered it an act of desertion and deported him, banning him from entering the country permanently. In February 2017, Yoo lost his second and final appeal regarding his entry ban which prohibited him from entry and any further appeals. However, citing procedural irregularities, the South Korean Supreme Court re-opened the case in July 2019 and sent the case to the Seoul High Court, ordering them to retry Yoo's case. In November 2019, the appeals court reversed the ban, paving the way for Yoo to return to the country, pending approval of a visa. One of Yoo's visa requests was denied in July 2020 by the Los Angeles Consulate, citing Korean law that allows discretion in denying visas to applicants that "posed a threat to public interest."

See also

 Forced Labour Convention
 Supplementary service in South Korea
 Social service agent
 Conscription in North Korea

References

External links

 South Korea's Military Service Act (in English)
 Military Manpower Administration official website 

Law enforcement in South Korea
Military of South Korea
South Korea
Unfree labour